Atrai is the southernmost upazila of Naogaon District, located in Bangladesh's Rajshahi Division. It is named after its principal watercourse, the Atrai River.

Geography

Atrai has 30570 households and total area 284.41 km2. Along with the Atrai River, the Nagor River, Pakar Beel, Chander Beel, Kaklaban Beel are notable water bodies. 

The upazula is bounded by Raninagar and Manda upazilas on the north, Natore sadar upazila on the south, Singra upazila on the east, Bagmara upazila on the west.

History

It is said that Islam Khan I, a Mughal Subahdar of Bengal, passed through Atrai (hence many villages have names such as Islampur and Islamganthi) and constructed a mosque known as the Islamganthi Mosque in the seventeenth century. Atrai later came under the zamindari of the Mollah political family.

In 1916, Atrai was officially established as a thana. In 1968, the Mollah Azad Memorial College was founded in Atrai. During the Bangladesh Liberation War of 1971, a brawl emerged between the two factions in Bandaikhara on 19 September. Another encounter took place near Ghaulya and Taranagar. In a surprise attack, nine Pakistan Army ships were sunk. Its status was upgraded to upazila (sub-district) in August 1983 as part of the President of Bangladesh Hussain Muhammad Ershad's decentralisation programme.

Demographics

According to 2011 Bangladesh census, Atrai had a population of 193,256. Males constituted 49.74% of the population and females 50.26%. Muslims formed 90.66% of the population, Hindus 9.31% and others 0.03%. Atrai had a literacy rate of 45.38% for the population 7 years and above.

As of the 1991 Bangladesh census, Atrai has a population of 166978. Males constitute 50.88% of the population, and females 49.12%. The population above the age of eighteen years is 83466.

Administration

Atrai Upazila is divided into eight union parishads: Ashanganj, Bhonpara, Bisha, Hatkalupara, Kalikapur, Maniari, Panchupur, and Sahagola. The union parishads are subdivided into 155 mauzas and 200 villages.

Atrai Thana was formed in 1916 and it was turned into an upazila on 1 August1983.

Chairmen

Facilities

Atrai Upazila has hundreds of mosques. Many of the mosques are notable tourist attractions in Atrai due to their antiquity or architectural style. These include the Islamganthi Mosque, Mahadighi Mosque, Qazipara Mosque and Mirpur Mosque. The mazar (mausoleum) of Naib Ali the Dervish is situated in Sannyasbari.

The upazila is home to other facilities such as the Madinatul Uloom Madrasa and Lillah Boarding Orphanage in Biharipur and the Bandaikhara Madhyapara Islamia Hafizia Madrasa and Orphanage Lillah Boarding.

Notable people
Ohidur Rahman, politician
Rabindranath Tagore, poet and Nobel laureate who had lived here

See also
Upazilas of Bangladesh
Districts of Bangladesh
Divisions of Bangladesh

References

Upazilas of Naogaon District